Up & Away is a 2006 album from indie-rock artist Gregory Douglass. "Hang Around" was given a music video and was released on YouTube.

Track listing
All songs by Gregory Douglass.	

 "Light Don't Shine"
 "Sentimental Fury"
 "Living"
 "Hang Around"
 "Annabelle"
 "Into the Sunset"
 "Who Knows"
 "See You Cry"
 "There She Goes"
 "Don't Get Caught"
 "Up & Away"

External links
 Lyrics

2006 albums
Gregory Douglass albums